Oonopidae, also known as goblin spiders, is a family of spiders consisting of over 1,600 described species in about 113 genera worldwide, with total species diversity estimated at 2000 to 2500 species. The type genus of the family is Oonops Keyserling, 1835.

Goblin spiders are generally tiny, measuring about 1 to 3 millimeters. Some have scuta, hardened plates on their abdomens. Oonopids usually have six eyes, the anterior median eyes having been lost. However, four-eyed (Opopaea viamao), two-eyed (e.g. Coxapopha, Diblemma) and even completely eyeless species (e.g. Cousinea, the cave-dwelling Blanioonops) are also known. The family is permeated with unusual morphological traits, many of which are limited to males. Examples include heavily modified mouthparts (e.g. Coxapopha, Xyccarph), sternal pouches (sometimes alternatively called holsters; e.g. Grymeus) and extensions of the carapace (e.g. Ferchestina, Unicorn). The male pedipalps are also often highly modified. The genus Opopaea, for example, exhibits an expanded palpal patella while male Ischnothyreus are characterized by completely sclerotized, pitch-black pedipalps. Members of the genus Orchestina are believed to be able to jump, as both sexes have greatly enlarged femora on the fourth leg pair.

Oonopidae are seldom seen by people as they are too small to be easily noticed. They are generally found in the leaf litter layer and under rocks, but they also constitute a significant component of the spider fauna living in the canopy of tropical rainforest. Three blind Afrotropical genera (Anophthalmoonops, Caecoonops, Termitoonops) are exclusively found in termite nests. A few species, such as the pantropical Heteroonops spinimanus and Triaeris stenaspis, are thought to be parthenogenetic as no males have yet been collected.

Fossil record 
Oonopidae are frequently encountered as subfossils preserved in copals and as fossils preserved in amber. Oonopids even occur in more amber deposits than any other spider family, which may be accounted for by their widespread distribution, small size, and wandering behaviour, as amber appears to be biased towards trapping such spiders. In contrast, sedimentary fossils of Oonopidae are unknown.

Most fossil oonopids described from amber are assigned to the extant genus Orchestina. This genus was already widespread by the end of the Cretaceous, as indicated by specimens found in amber dating back over 100 million years.

Genera 

, the World Spider Catalog accepts the following genera:

Amazoonops Ott, Ruiz, Brescovit & Bonaldo, 2017
Anophthalmoonops Benoit, 1976 — Angola
Antoonops Fannes & Jocqué, 2008 — Africa
Aposphragisma Thoma, 2014 — Asia
Aprusia Simon, 1893 — Sri Lanka, India
Aschnaoonops Makhan & Ezzatpanah, 2011 — Suriname, Colombia, Trinidad
Australoonops Hewitt, 1915 — South Africa, Mozambique
Bannana Tong & Li, 2015 — China
Bidysderina Platnick, Dupérré, Berniker & Bonaldo, 2013
Bipoonops Bolzern, 2014 — Ecuador
Birabenella Grismado, 2010 — Argentina, Chile
Blanioonops Simon & Fage, 1922 — East Africa
Brignolia Dumitrescu & Georgescu, 1983 — Asia, Africa, Australia
Caecoonops Benoit, 1964 — Congo
Camptoscaphiella Caporiacco, 1934 — Asia
Cavisternum Baehr, Harvey & Smith, 2010 — Australia, Sri Lanka
Cortestina Knoflach, 2009 — Austria, Italy
Costarina Platnick & Dupérré, 2011 — Central America, Colombia, Mexico
Cousinea Saaristo, 2001 — Seychelles
Coxapopha Platnick, 2000 — South America, Panama
Dalmasula Platnick, Szüts & Ubick, 2012 — South Africa, Namibia
Diblemma O. Pickard-Cambridge, 1908 — Seychelles
Dysderina Simon, 1892 — Asia, Africa, South America
Dysderoides Fage, 1946 — Thailand, India
Emboonops Bolzern, Platnick & Berniker, 2015 — Mexico
Escaphiella Platnick & Dupérré, 2009 — North America, South America, Central America, Jamaica
Farqua Saaristo, 2001 — Seychelles
Gamasomorpha Karsch, 1881 — Asia, Africa, South America, Oceania, North America, Panama, Saint Vincent and the Grenadines
Gradunguloonops Grismado, Izquierdo, González M. & Ramírez, 2015
Grymeus Harvey, 1987 — Australia, Sri Lanka
Guaraguaoonops Brescovit, Rheims & Bonaldo, 2012
Guatemoonops Bolzern, Platnick & Berniker, 2015
Heteroonops Dalmas, 1916 — Caribbean, Costa Rica, Mexico, Germany, Africa, Australia
Hexapopha Platnick, Berniker & Víquez, 2014 — Costa Rica
Himalayana Grismado, 2014 — India, Nepal
Hortoonops Platnick & Dupérré, 2012 — 
Hypnoonops Benoit, 1977 — Congo
Hytanis Simon, 1893 — Venezuela
Ischnothyreus Simon, 1893 — Asia, Oceania, Africa, Europe
Kachinia Tong & Li, 2018 — Myanmar
Kapitia Forster, 1956 — New Zealand
Khamiscar Platnick & Berniker, 2015 — Madagascar
Khamisia Saaristo & van Harten, 2006 — Israel, Yemen, Kenya
Khamisina Platnick & Berniker, 2015 — Nigeria, Kenya, Congo
Khamisoides Platnick & Berniker, 2015 — Virgin Is.
Kijabe Berland, 1914 — Kenya
Lionneta Benoit, 1979 — Seychelles
Longoonops Platnick & Dupérré, 2010 — Central America, Jamaica
Lucetia Dumitrescu & Georgescu, 1983 — Cuba, Venezuela
Malagiella Ubick & Griswold, 2011 — Madagascar
Megabulbus Saaristo, 2007 — Israel
Megaoonops Saaristo, 2007 — Israel
Melchisedec Fannes, 2010 — Niger
Molotra Ubick & Griswold, 2011 — Madagascar
Neotrops Grismado & Ramírez, 2013 — South America, Panama, Trinidad
Neoxyphinus Birabén, 1953 — South America, Caribbean
Nephrochirus Simon, 1910 — Namibia
Niarchos Platnick & Dupérré, 2010 — Ecuador, Colombia, Peru
Noideattella Álvarez-Padilla, Ubick & Griswold, 2012 — Madagascar, Seychelles
Noonops Platnick & Berniker, 2013 — Mexico, United States
Oonopinus Simon, 1893 — Europe, Africa, Venezuela, China, Samoa, United States
Oonopoides Bryant, 1940 — Central America, Venezuela, North America, Cuba
Oonops Templeton, 1835 — South America, Caribbean, Europe, Africa, North America, Georgia, Oceania, Central America
Opopaea Simon, 1892 — Oceania, Africa, Asia, North America, Panama, South America, Europe
Orchestina Simon, 1882 — Africa, Asia, South America, North America, Central America, Europe, Caribbean, Oceania
Ovobulbus Saaristo, 2007 — Israel, Egypt
Paradysderina Platnick & Dupérré, 2011 — South America
Patri Saaristo, 2001 — Seychelles
Pelicinus Simon, 1892 — Asia, Brazil, Africa, Australia
Pescennina Simon, 1903 — Central America, South America, Mexico
Plectoptilus Simon, 1905 — Indonesia
Ponsoonops Bolzern, 2014 — Central America, Mexico, South America, Cuba
Predatoroonops Brescovit, Rheims & Ott, 2012
Prethopalpus Baehr, Harvey, Burger & Thoma, 2012 — Oceania, Asia
Prida Saaristo, 2001 — Seychelles
Prodysderina Platnick, Dupérré, Berniker & Bonaldo, 2013 — Venezuela
Pseudodysderina Platnick, Berniker & Bonaldo, 2013 — South America
Pseudoscaphiella Simon, 1907 — South Africa
Puan Izquierdo, 2012 — Argentina
Reductoonops Platnick & Berniker, 2014 — Central America, Mexico, South America, Jamaica
Scaphidysderina Platnick & Dupérré, 2011 — Ecuador, Peru, Colombia
Scaphiella Simon, 1892 — Central America, Caribbean, South America, North America
Scaphioides Bryant, 1942 — Caribbean, North America, Costa Rica
Scaphios Platnick & Dupérré, 2010 — Ecuador, Colombia
Semibulbus Saaristo, 2007 — Israel
Semidysderina Platnick & Dupérré, 2011 — Colombia
Setayeshoonops Makhan & Ezzatpanah, 2011 — Suriname
Sicariomorpha Ott & Harvey, 2015 — Malaysia
Silhouettella Benoit, 1979 — Asia, Africa
Simlops Bonaldo, Ott & Ruiz, 2014 — South America, Trinidad
Simonoonops Harvey, 2002 — South America, Caribbean
Socotroonops Saaristo & van Harten, 2002 — Yemen
Spinestis Saaristo & Marusik, 2009 — Ukraine
Stenoonops Simon, 1892 — North America, Central America, Caribbean, South America, Seychelles
Sulsula Simon, 1882 — Algeria, Egypt, Sudan
Tapinesthis Simon, 1914 — Europe
Telchius Simon, 1893 — Algeria, Morocco, South Africa
Termitoonops Benoit, 1964 — Congo
Tinadysderina Platnick, Berniker & Bonaldo, 2013
Tolegnaro Álvarez-Padilla, Ubick & Griswold, 2012
Toloonops Bolzern, Platnick & Berniker, 2015 — Mexico
Triaeris Simon, 1892 — Asia, Africa, Australia
Tridysderina Platnick, Berniker & Bonaldo, 2013
Trilacuna Tong & Li, 2007 — Asia
Unicorn Platnick & Brescovit, 1995 — Argentina, Chile, Bolivia
Varioonops Bolzern & Platnick, 2013 — Central America, South America
Vientianea Tong & Li, 2013 — Laos
Volborattella Saucedo & Ubick, 2015
Wanops Chamberlin & Ivie, 1938 — Mexico
Xestaspis Simon, 1884 — Asia, Oceania, Africa
Xiombarg Brignoli, 1979 — Brazil, Argentina
Xyccarph Brignoli, 1978 — Brazil
Xyphinus Simon, 1893 — Asia, Australia
Yumates Chamberlin, 1924 — Mexico
Zyngoonops Benoit, 1977 — Congo

Extinct genera 

 †Burmorchestina Wunderlich 2008 Burmese amber, Myanmar, Cenomanian
 †Canadaorchestina Wunderlich 2008 Canadian amber, Campanian
 †Fossilopaea Wunderlich 1988 Dominican amber, Miocene

Gallery

References

Further reading
Jocqué, R. & Dippenaar-Schoeman, A. S. (2006). Spider Families of the World. Royal Museum for Central Africa. 336 pp. .
Penney, D. (2006). Fossil oonopid spiders in Cretaceous ambers from Canada and Myanmar. Palaeontology 49(1): 229–235.
Penney, D. (2004). New spiders in upper Cretaceous amber from New Jersey in the American Museum of Natural History (Arthropoda: Araneae). Palaeontology 47(2): 367–375.

External links

Goblin Spider Planetary Biodiversity Inventory. American Museum of Natural History.

 
Araneomorphae families